Showqabad (also Romanized as Showqābād; also known as ‘Eshqābād) is a village in Seyyed Shahab Rural District, in the Central District of Tuyserkan County, Hamadan Province, Iran. At the 2006 census, its population was 217, in 47 families.

References 

Populated places in Tuyserkan County